Wright Street is an east–west street in the centre of Adelaide, South Australia. Among the buildings on Wright Street is the Juvenile Court.

The street was named after John Wright, a financier who was appointed a Colonial Commissioner of SA in May 1835.

See also

References

Streets in Adelaide